The 2014 White Spot / Delta Road Race was a one-day women's cycle  race held in Tsawwassen, British Columbia, Canada on 6 July 2014. The race has an UCI rating of 1.2.

Result

References

Grand Prix cycliste de Gatineau
Grand Prix cycliste de Gatineau
Cycle races in Canada